William Doran (November 13, 1834 – November 12, 1903) was mayor of Hamilton, Ontario from 1888 to 1889.

External links 
 

1834 births
1903 deaths
Mayors of Hamilton, Ontario